Christopher Shane Berry is an American character actor best known for his roles in 12 Years a Slave (2013), The Walking Dead (2015) and Spider-Man: Homecoming (2017).

Early life and career
Christopher Berry was born in San Antonio, Texas and grew up in San Angelo, Texas. He studied acting under professional acting instructor John Dennis at LSU. He moved to New Orleans in 2009. Of his experience, Berry stated "New Orleans basically made me a full-time working actor...by just being frugal, I've managed to make a living at it, and not a bad living." He also credits it to getting connected to other professionals in the business such as Matthew McConaughey and Quentin Tarantino. Berry gained further recognition for his role on The Walking Dead as Negan's Scout and for uttering the famous line "Your property now belongs to Negan." Behind the scenes, Berry had come up with a name for his character (Bud) and a convincing backstory which many fans have taken as canon. He appeared in the film Spider-Man: Homecoming as one of the film's antagonists.

Personal life
Berry is a Texas Longhorns fan and considers Earl Campbell his favorite.

Filmography

References

External links

Living people
People from San Angelo, Texas
Year of birth missing (living people)
Male actors from Texas
Louisiana State University alumni